Stromae is a Belgian musician. He won over 50 awards and was nominated over 80 times for his contributions to the music industry. He has recorded three studio albums: Cheese (2010), Racine carrée (2013) and Multitude (2022)

Awards and nominations

References by andreas

Stromae
Awards